Thank You & Goodnight is the seventh and final studio album by Irish boy band Boyzone, which was released on 16 November 2018. The album sold 100,000 copies in the UK.

Background
In December 2017, it was announced that the album had been finalised and was ready for release in 2018. In April 2018, it was confirmed that Boyzone would release a new studio album and would tour the UK in 2019 with arena shows. Keith Duffy announced in March 2017 that Boyzone had a signed a contract with Warner Music for an album and an arena tour.<

The album has an "urban" influence, as opposed to the ballads the band is famous for singing Shane Lynch stated the album would be similar in style to that of American singer Charlie Puth. Ronan Keating said that each member picked three songs for the track listing, making it more "a Boyzone playlist" than an actual album: "So Shane’s tracks have a very urban feel while mine have a country pop feel. There’s dance tracks, there’s rock tracks, so there are different flavours of all of us on this album. So as a fan you can pick two or three songs that work for you and are the types of songs you wanna listen to." Duffy said "it's not a very structured record" but called the album "the best work we've ever done".

Gary Barlow, Calum Scott and Ed Sheeran contributed to the album. It was previously reported that Sam Smith wrote a song for the album, but the track did not end up on the final track listing.

Singles
 "Dream" was released on 15 June 2018 as the album's lead single. It features the vocals of late Stephen Gately, who also co-wrote the song. The song was originally titled "I Can Dream" and was a B-side for the Gately single "Stay".
 "Because" was released on 26 July 2018 as the album's second single.
 "Love" was released on 4 October 2018 as the album's third single.

Critical reception

Lucy Mapstone reviewed the album and said it was one of the strongest albums the band has released. She commented "The irony is that the record is a real triumph, and serves as a frustrating reminder that there just aren't many bands of this pop-friendly caliber around these days. With a helping hand from songwriters Ed Sheeran and Gary Barlow, there is little here that under-delivers, and the four singers have given it their all with a collection of tracks that will keep fans happy for years. Love, penned by Barlow, is an anthem, in keeping with Boyzone's ballad-friendly style, while Normal Boy is a peppier effort, reminiscent of their 1997 hit Picture Of You. Because, by Sheeran, is all bouncy guitars and clever lyrics, and it works for lead singer Ronan Keating's honeyed vocals. Dream, created from a 2002 demo of Gately's and reworked with the band harmonising alongside him, is touchingly beautiful and will take fans back to their 1990s heyday. The band are certainly bowing out on a high, and have delivered one of the strongest albums of their career."

Tour

The band embarked on the Thank You & Goodnight Tour to promote the album, which was also their last tour.

Track listing

Notes
  signifies an additional producer

Charts

Weekly charts

Year-end charts

Certifications

References

2018 albums
Boyzone albums
Albums published posthumously
Albums produced by Cutfather